Robert De Souza Ribeiro (born 9 May 1992), commonly known as Robert, is a Brazilian footballer.

Career statistics

Club

Notes

References

1992 births
Living people
Brazilian footballers
Association football forwards
Rio Branco Atlético Clube players
Al-Rawdhah Club players
Saudi Second Division players
Brazilian expatriate footballers
Brazilian expatriate sportspeople in Albania
Expatriate footballers in Albania
Brazilian expatriate sportspeople in Saudi Arabia
Expatriate footballers in Saudi Arabia